Sphenarpites is an extinct genus of cephalopod belonging to the family Hildoceratidae. Only one specimen is known, which has been found in Kelat, Baluchistan, in today's Pakistan. Its involute, oxycone shell has very small umbilicus and umbilical wall is smoothly rounded. Suture is reduced with 1 or 2 adventitious saddles and about 10 auxiliary saddles in external suture.

References

Ammonites of Asia
Early Jurassic ammonites
Hildoceratidae
Ammonitida genera